Cape Pankof (also spelled Pan'kov and Pankov) and Pankov Rock are located on Unimak Island in the Aleutian Islands in the U.S. state of Alaska, at  and  respectively. They were named by Russian explorer Gavril Sarychev after the Aleut Toien (Chief) Sergey Pan'kov in 1791.

External links
, Pankov Vyacheslav (2000).
(на русском: Сайт Паньковых), Вячеслав Паньков.

Landforms of Aleutians East Borough, Alaska
Pankof